REM: International Engineering Journal is a peer-reviewed open access scholarly journal publishing research articles across civil, geological, metallurgical, mechanical, and mining engineering. The current editor-in-chief is Jório Coelho. 
It changed name from REM: Revista Escola de Minas to the current title in 2016. The journal is sponsored by the Brazilian National Council for Scientific and Technological Development (CNPq) and Fundação Gorceix (named after Claude-Henri Gorceix).

Abstracting and indexing 
The journal is abstracted and indexed in:

References

External links 
 

Open access journals
Publications established in 1936
Engineering journals